Čudna noč is an album by Slovenian a cappella band Perpetuum Jazzile released in 2006 by Dallas Records.

The album was produced and arranged by Slovenian producer and singer Tomaž Kozlevčar. The whole album consists of cover songs.

Track listing
Source: Official site

References

2006 albums
Perpetuum Jazzile albums
Slovene-language albums